James Watts (born January 24, 1980), also known by the moniker KiloWatts, is an American electronic musician. He has toured across Australia, Canada, Europe, and the United States since 2002.  His 2007 release Ground State was said to lead the devoted listener to a state of total hypnosis by Side-Line Magazine.  In 2006, Igloo Magazine called his album Routes "a lifetime of travel compressed into an hour of aural
head-tripping."  His project with Tanner Ross, entitled Voodeux, was reviewed by XLR8R Magazine and could only be described as "...if maverick producers Ricardo Villalobos and Bruno Pronsato plundered Lustmord's harddrive full of tar-black ambience..."  His collaboration with Bluetech, called Invisible Allies, was included in Headphone Commute's Best Of 2010 collection.

Discography

KiloWatts
 2002 – Perfected Everything (DayLite Records)
 2003 – EP Phone Home (DayLite Records)
 2005 – Pasta EP (Kahvi Collective)
 2005 – Problem/Solving (Artificial Music Machine)
 2005 – Problems/Solved (Artificial Music Machine)
 2006 – Routes (Artificial Music Machine)
 2007 – Ground State (Native State Records)
 2007 – Quickfire (KiloWatts Music)
 2007 – Teknopera (KiloWatts Music)
 2007 – Uprouted (KiloWatts Music)
 2008 – Exit The Laugh (Harmonious Discord)
 2008 – Snakewinds (Thoughtless Music)
 2008 – Luna Rd (Harmonious Discord)
 2009 – Love on Saturn (Thoughtless Music)
 2009 – Six Silicates (KiloWatts Music)
 2009 – Undercurrent (Somnia)
 2010 – Nocturnal Sunrise (Harmonious Discord)
 2010 – Timekeeper (Thoughtless Music)
 2010 – The Right Words (KiloWatts Music)
 2012 – Acceptitude  (KiloWatts Music)
 2014 – Seven Succulents  (KiloWatts Music)
 2019 - Sympathetic Vibrations (KiloWatts Music)
 2020 - Eight Experiments (KiloWatts Music)

Invisible Allies
Invisible Allies is KiloWatts and Bluetech.
 2010 – Hyperdimensional Animals (Native State Records)
 2014 – Conversations With Bees (Aleph Zero Records)

KiloWatts and Vanek
KiloWatts & Vanek is James Watts and Peter Van Ewijk.  Together they have released albums on Diffusion Records, founded by Andrew Sega, and German-based industrial label Dependent Records.
 2004 – RawQ (Diffusion Records)
 2009 – Sinnerstate (Motor Music)
 2009 – Focus & Flow (Dependent Records)
 2022 - Perennials (End Of Time Records)

Voodeux
Voodeux is KiloWatts and Tanner Ross, who have released on Dirtybird Records and Mothership, founded by Claude VonStroke.
 2007 – The Curse (Mothership)
 2009 – Bones (Mothership)
 2009 – Just A Spoonful (Mothership)
 2009 – The Paranormal (Mothership)

Skeetaz
Skeetaz is a collaboration between KiloWatts and Bil Bless.
 2007 – Ma Skeeta Bytes Vol. 1 (Proboscis)
 2007 – Skeetaz EP (Addictech Records)
 2008 – Off (Proboscis)

Super Galactic Expansive
Super Galactic Expansive is a collaboration between KiloWatts and Amagine.  They have released two albums on Sound Tribe Sector 9's label, 1320 Records.
 2010 – Supersensible Science (1320 Records)
 2012 – Constants + Variables (1320 Records)
 2022 - Satellites

References

External links

 Official site
 KiloWatts at Discogs
 It's Time You Heard KiloWatts in-depth interview on Lost in Sound 2011

American record producers
Trip hop musicians
Breakbeat musicians
Living people
1980 births